Gleb Svyatoslavich (c. 1168–1215/1220) was a Rus' prince (a member of the Rurik dynasty). His baptismal name was Pakhomy. He was prince of Kaniv (before 1192–1194), of Belgorod (1205–1206), and of Chernigov (1206/1208–1215/1220). He helped to pay for the Church of St. Paraskeva Pyatnitsa in Chernigov.

His life
He was the fourth son of Grand Prince Svyatoslav Vsevolodovich of Kiev and Maria Vasilkovna of Polotsk.

In 1180 his father sent him to assist Prince Roman Glebovich of Ryazan (Svyatoslav Vsevolodovich's son-in-law) against his brothers who were assisted by Prince Vsevolod Yuryevich of Suzdalia. But the latter defeated Roman Glebovich and took Gleb captive. One late source claims that Gleb went to Vsevolod Yuryevich in good faith but the latter summoned him deceitfully. Another late source claims that he was captured while all his troops were inebriated. Although his father invaded Suzdalia, his campaign turned into a farce, because Vsevolod Yuryevich deflected his every attempt to initiate battle.

At the beginning of 1182, Vsevolod Yuryevich set Gleb free and reestablished friendly relations with his father who had dropped his claim to Novgorod. At the beginning of 1183, Gleb married Anastasia Ryurikovna, a daughter of Prince Rurik Rostislavich of Belgorod. His father-in-law appointed him Kaniv.

In the summer of 1184, his father and father-in-law launched a major campaign against the Cumans, and Svyatoslav Vsevolodovich also summoned his two sons, Gleb and Mstislav. On July 30, the princes were victorious at the river Erel.

In 1188, Svyatoslav Vsevolodovich sent Gleb to negotiate with King Béla III of Hungary who was the father-in-law of the Byzantine emperor, Isaac II Angelos. Later evidence suggests that his father asked Béla III to arrange a marriage between Gleb's daughter and a prince of Byzantium.

In 1190, the Cumans attacked towns along the Ros River, and later they frequently raided the region. Rurik Rostislavich (Gleb's father-in-law) suggested that Svyatoslav Vsevolodovich send Gleb to the region, but the latter did not send his son. In 1192 Gleb did not join the campaign of the other Olgovichi (the members of the ruling dynasty of Chernigov) against the Cumans, because his father had ordered him to stay in Kaniv and defend the Ros frontier.

On July 25, a Greek delegation arrived to Kiev to collect his daughter, Evfimia as bride for the emperor's son. Gleb's father died during the last week of July, 1194; his death changed the order of seniority among the Olgovichi: his only brother, Yaroslav Vsevolodovich became the new senior prince of the dynasty, and Gleb became answerable to his uncle. Gleb probably inherited a domain in the Vyatichi lands, and his father-in-law, who became the Grand Prince of Kiev, removed him from Kaniv.

When Prince Vsevolod Yuryevich of Suzdalia (accompanied by the princes of Ryazan, Murom, and the Cumans) attacked the principality of Chernigov in 1196, Gleb was placed, together with his brother Oleg, in charge of defending Chernigov against Rurik Rostislavich (his father-in-law).

When, in 1205, his father-in-law who had been tonsured as a monk threw off the monk's habit and reinstated himself in Kiev, the Olgovichi marched to Kiev, met Rurik Rostislavich, and made a pact to attack Halych. His father-in-law paid them for their support by giving Belgorod to Gleb's brother, Vsevolod; Vsevolod Svyatoslavich, in turn, handed it over to Gleb.

In 1206, his brother Vsevolod Svyatoslavich seized Kiev, and Gleb occupied Chernigov. At the beginning of 1207, his brother (who had been expelled from Kiev by Rurik Rostislavich) marched against the town, and his attacking force constituted only his brother Gleb and Mstislav with their sons. However, Rurik Rostislavich (Gleb's father-in-law) was prepared for the attack and successfully kept the besiegers outside the walls. They pillaged around Kiev for three weeks but accomplished nothing and withdrew.

In 1212, Vsevolod Svyatoslavich, who had been defeated by Mstislav Romanovich, fled from Kiev and sought safety in Chernigov. His enemies pursued him, but failed to capture the well-defended citadel. After some two weeks they succeeded only in setting fire to the outer town and in pillaging surrounding villages. In the meantime, Vsevolod Svyatoslavich died, and his passing probably expedited an armistice between Mstislav Romanovich and Gleb. Gleb acknowledged the rule of Mstislav Romanovich in Kiev and renounced any claim to the town during his lifetime.

Gleb was last mentioned under 1215 when his daughter married Vladimir Glebovich of Pereyaslavl. Consequently, Gleb died between that event and 1220 when his brother, Mstislav commanded a campaign as prince of Chernigov. In 1219, he may have helped Mstislav Mstislavich to defend Halych against the Hungarians.

Marriage and children
#1183: Anastasia Ryurikovna, a daughter of Prince Rurik Rostislavich of Belgorod and Anna Yuryevna of Turov
Prince Mstislav III Glebovich of Chernigov (before 1215/1220 – after October 18, 1239)
Evfimia Glebovna, betrothed to Alexios Angelos
Unnamed Glebovna (? – February 7, 1238), wife of Prince Vladimir Vsevolodovich of Pereyaslavl

Ancestors

Footnotes

Sources
Dimnik, Martin: The Dynasty of Chernigov - 1146-1246; Cambridge University Press, 2003, Cambridge; .

Olgovichi family
Princes of Chernigov
13th-century princes in Kievan Rus'
Eastern Orthodox monarchs
12th-century births
13th-century deaths